The Unified Armenians Party (Miavorvats Hayer Kusaksutyun) is a political party in Armenia. It is led by Ruben Avagyan.

History
The party nominated Ruben Avagyan as its candidate in the 2003 Armenian presidential election. Avagyan came in sixth place, receiving 0.41% of the vote.

The party failed to gain any representation in the National Assembly after the 2012 Armenian parliamentary election, receiving just 0.20% of the popular vote.

In 2017, the party formed the "Armenian Renaissance" alliance and merged with Orinats Yerkir, a centrist Pro-European political party. However, the alliance failed to win any seats following the 2017 Armenian parliamentary election, receiving only 3.72% of the popular vote. The alliance dissolved shortly after.

The party did not participate in the 2018 Armenian parliamentary election.

Ideology
The party maintains a centrist, national-patriotic ideology and supports the development a strong civil society and democracy in Armenia, while strengthening living standards and the middle-class. The party also supports the self-determination of the Republic of Artsakh and the activities of the Armenian Apostolic Church.

The parties manifesto calls for the continued European integration of Armenia and states that European integration will contribute to Armenia's and the Caucasus regions stability and economic development. The party also believes in maintaining close cooperation with Russia and CIS member states.

See also

Programs of political parties in Armenia

References

External links
 Unified Armenians Party on Facebook

Political parties established in 2000
2000 establishments in Armenia
Political parties in Armenia
Centrist parties in Europe
Pro-European political parties in Armenia